Crossland is an unincorporated community in Calloway County, Kentucky, United States.  The town is on the Kentucky-Tennessee state line and was named for Edward Crossland who was a local judge at the time.  The town had a post office from March 28, 1868, until 1925.

References

Unincorporated communities in Calloway County, Kentucky
Unincorporated communities in Kentucky